Wadfradad II (also spelled Autophradates II) was a dynast (frataraka) of Persis in the late 2nd-century BC, ruling sometime after 138 BC. He was appointed as frataraka by the Parthian king Mithridates I, who granted him more autonomy, most likely in an effort to maintain healthy relations with Persis as the Parthian Empire was under constant conflict with the Saka, Seleucids, and Characene. The coinage of Wadfradad I shows influence from the coins minted under Mithridates I. Wadfradad I was succeeded by Darayan I, the first of the Kings of Persis.

References

Sources 
 .
 
 
 
 
 

2nd-century BC Iranian people
History of Fars Province
2nd-century BC rulers in Asia
Vassal rulers of the Parthian Empire
Zoroastrian rulers
Frataraka rulers of Persis